Nqabisa Gantsho is a South African politician from the Eastern Cape who has served as a Member of the National Assembly of South Africa since 2019, representing the African National Congress.

Background
Gantsho holds a diploma in marketing management. A member of the African National Congress, she has been a regional executive committee member and a regional working committee member of the party's Sarah Baartman region in the Eastern Cape. She also serves on the provincial executive committee of the African National Congress Women's League.

Parliamentary career
Gantsho stood for election to the South African National Assembly in the 2019 general election as ninth on the ANC's Eastern Cape regional to national list. At the election, she won a seat in parliament. Upon election, she became a member of the Portfolio Committee on Environment, Forestry and Fisheries.

References

External links

Gantsho, Nqabisa at African National Congress Parliamentary Caucus

Living people
Year of birth missing (living people)
Place of birth missing (living people)
People from the Eastern Cape
Xhosa people
African National Congress politicians
Members of the National Assembly of South Africa
Women members of the National Assembly of South Africa